Lydia Sarfati is a Polish-born American esthetician, entrepreneur, consultant and author. She is credited with having introduced seaweed-based skin treatments in the United States. In 1980, she founded the Sarkli-Repêchage, a seaweed-based cosmetics company, together with her husband David Sarfati. She is the author of several books on cosmetology and wellness.

Early life
Lydia Sarfati was born in Poland. She is the daughter of Polish Jews Szloma and Sofia Mops, both of whom were survivors of the Holocaust. Sarfati grew up in Legnica; during her time in Poland, she took her first professional training, a medically oriented skin care course.

In New York, she met her future husband, David Sarfati, and the two married in 1972. The couple had two children, and to support them, Lydia worked as an esthetician in Queens and, in the evenings, received private customers at the makeshift beauty salon she had improvised at her home.

Career
Together with a friend, Shoshana Kliot, she opened a salon, the Klisar Skin Care Center, in September 1977. The popularity of the salon grew when magazines such as Vogue, Mademoiselle, Harper's Bazaar, and the New York Times Magazine wrote about Sarfati's esthetic services. In 1980, she introduced the Four Layer Facial and, today, her skincare method is taught in more than 200 schools around the world.

Repêchage
In 1983, she gave up on her successful salon business, and sold her share to her partner. She developed the Four-Layer Facial produced by the Repêchage company, which she founded together with her husband. The firm also manufactured cleaners, lotions, moisturizers and other skin care treatments. One of the most successful products was the full body treatment based on seaweed, the use of which Sarfati pioneered in the United States. Repêchage also popularized other ingredients used in thalassotherapy, such as sea water and salts.

Repêchage sells seaweed-based treatments and cosmetic products in over 45 countries. The company's headquarters are located in Secaucus, New Jersey, where Repêchage runs a 50,000 square foot, ISO 9001:2015 certified manufacturing, research, and development facility as well as a post-graduate esthetics academy.

Other activities
Lydia Sarfati is a speaker and consultant for the spa industry. Sarfati  published Success at your Fingertips, which covers all aspects involved in running a skin care business.

References

External links
LydiaSarfati.com

Living people
American businesspeople in retailing
American business writers
Women business writers
American consultants
American consulting businesspeople
American cosmetics businesspeople
American people of Polish-Jewish descent
American women in business
Businesspeople from Queens, New York
Cosmetics people
People from Queens, New York
Polish emigrants to the United States
People from Legnica
Year of birth missing (living people)
21st-century American women